The 2016 New Zealand Radio Awards were the awards for excellence in the New Zealand radio industry during 2015. It was the 39th New Zealand Radio Awards, recognising staff, volunteers and contractors in both commercial and non-commercial broadcasting.

Winners and nominees

This is a list of nominees, with winners in bold.

Associated Craft Award

Best Children's Programme

Best Community Access Programmes

Best Community Campaign

Best Content

Best Maori Language Broadcast

Best Marketing Campaign

Best Music Feature

Best New Broadcaster

Best News

Best On Air

Best Promotion

Best Radio Creative

Best Radio Website

Best Spoken Programmes

Best Sport

Best Technical Production

Sales Team of the Year

Station of the Year

'The Blackie' (Award)

Sir Paul Holmes Broadcaster of the Year

Outstanding Contribution to Radio

Services to Broadcasting

Special Recognition

References

New Zealand Radio Awards